Asterolamia is a genus of medium-sized sea snails, marine gastropod mollusks in the family Eulimidae.

Species

There are only two known species within this genus of gastropods:

 Asterolamia cingulata (Warén, 1980)
 Asterolamia hians Warén, 1980

References

External links
 To World Register of Marine Species

Eulimidae